Crash Bandicoot is a series of platform video games created by Andy Gavin and Jason Rubin. Formerly developed by Naughty Dog from 1996 to 1999, by Traveller's Tales, Eurocom and Vicarious Visions from 2000 to 2004, and by Radical Entertainment from 2005 to 2008, the series is currently published by Activision. The series features a large cast of distinctive characters designed by numerous different artists, which include Charles Zembillas and Joe Pearson. It also features a cast of veteran voice actors.

The series centers on the conflicts between a mutated bandicoot named Crash Bandicoot and his creator, Doctor Neo Cortex. Crash acts as the main playable character of the series, though other characters have had occasional player access, such as Coco Bandicoot and Doctor Neo Cortex.

Protagonists

Crash Bandicoot

Crash Bandicoot is the title character and main protagonist of the Crash Bandicoot series. Crash is a mutant eastern barred bandicoot who was genetically enhanced by the series' main antagonist Doctor Neo Cortex and soon escaped from Cortex's castle after a failed experiment in the "Cortex Vortex". Throughout the series, Crash acts as the opposition against Cortex and his schemes for world domination. While Crash has a number of offensive maneuvers at his disposal, his most distinctive technique is one in which he spins like a tornado at high speeds and knocks away almost anything that he strikes.

Aku Aku
Aku Aku is the guardian of the Wumpa Islands and the father figure of Crash and his friends. Aku Aku is the spirit of an ancient witch doctor encased in a floating, wooden mask. During Crash's missions to stop Doctor Neo Cortex, he scattered copies of himself throughout the travels in an effort to aid him in his mission. Whenever Crash possesses an Aku Aku mask, he will be shielded from one enemy attack or contact. Collecting three Aku Aku masks gives Crash temporary invulnerability from all minor dangers. He is voiced by Mel Winkler from Crash Bandicoot: Warped to Crash Twinsanity, by Cornell John in Crash Bash, and Greg Eagles from Crash of the Titans onwards.

Aku Aku was named after a Polynesian restaurant near the Alewife station that featured giant tiki statues out front. Steven Rodriguez of Nintendo World Report, in his review of Crash Nitro Kart, described Aku Aku's voice when giving advice between races as "sexy" and cited it as the best part of the game's audio, but admitted that "even he gets rather annoying." In his review of Crash of the Titans, Brian Rowe of GameRevolution, while deeming the ability to "slap Aku Aku’s face into the ground and ride it like a surfboard" as "harshly inconsiderate", considered it "payback for his gratingly poor impersonations of that other floating head of wisdom – Frylock." Lucas Sullivan of GamesRadar+, in a dedicated installment of the "Why I Love" series, compared Aku Aku's charm to that of Mumbo Jumbo of Banjo-Kazooie, adding that his vocalizations and protective hovering within Crash's vicinity exuded more personality than the power-ups in the Mario series. He also enjoyed Aku Aku's speaking role in the series' later installments, describing his voice as having a "vaguely Morgan Freeman-esque timbre". The staff of GameRevolution included Aku Aku in a list of the best power-ups in video games, describing him as an "all-around swell guy".

Coco Bandicoot
Coco Bandicoot is Crash's spirited and highly intelligent younger sister. By nature, she is a tinkerer and problem solver, possessing an innate inquisitiveness and fanciful imagination. She is frequently equipped with a laptop or tablet computer, which is filled with schematics, works in progress, and personal notes. Unlike Crash, she possesses a healthy skepticism of others and their motivations. She seeks to get Crash's relaxed lifestyle more organized, and while she is content to allow Crash to make his own mistakes and derive amusement from the results, she is prepared to intervene when Crash finds himself in legitimate danger.

Coco first appeared in Crash Bandicoot 2: Cortex Strikes Back, in which she uses her hacking skills to sporadically appear via hologram and warn Crash of Cortex's intentions. She appears as a playable character in select levels of Crash Bandicoot: Warped and Crash Bandicoot: The Wrath of Cortex. She is twice incapacitated in her minor appearance in Crash Twinsanity, and is kidnapped and brainwashed into aiding Nina Cortex's plot in Crash of the Titans; in the Nintendo DS version of the latter game, she appears as a vendor selling upgrades for Crash's abilities. In the Wii and Xbox 360 versions of Crash: Mind over Mutant, Coco becomes a playable character in the two-player mode after being freed from the influence of the NV device. She is a selectable player character for the entirety of Crash Bandicoot 4: It's About Time, and is the subject of a number of unlockable "Flashback Tape" levels, which take place during the course of the first game. The tapes reveal that Coco was created by Cortex a month after Crash's escape from his castle, and was Cortex's last bandicoot before he would consider replacement animals. Coco's signature overalls were a hand me down originally crafted by Doctor N. Brio's mother and donated by Cortex without Brio's consent. During her training, Coco displayed a fascination with technology (as well as a video game addiction), which Doctor N. Gin took as an opportunity to mentor her in mechanics and computing. Coco ultimately escaped Cortex's castle under the guise of undertaking another trial.

Coco is a playable character in the racing games Crash Team Racing, Crash Nitro Kart, and Crash Tag Team Racing, as well as the party titles Crash Bash and Crash Boom Bang!. Following a minor appearance in Crash Bandicoot: The Huge Adventure, she appears as a brainwashed boss character in Crash Bandicoot 2: N-Tranced, in which she is subsequently a playable character in select levels. In Crash Bandicoot Purple: Ripto's Rampage, she teams up with the Professor of the Spyro series to track down Cortex and Ripto. After being freed from Nina Cortex's capture, the pair are able to trace the villains to their hideout with Crash's and Spyro's assistance.

Coco was designed by Charles Zembillas and Naughty Dog as a counterbalance to Tawna (Crash's girlfriend in the first game) that would appease Sony Computer Entertainment Japan, who were not comfortable with a "super sexy" character being alongside Crash. Charles Zembillas' first sketches of Coco were drawn on March 18, 1997. She is voiced by Vicki Winters in Cortex Strikes Back, Hynden Walch in Crash Team Racing, Debi Derryberry from Crash Bandicoot: The Wrath of Cortex to Crash Bandicoot: On the Run!, Tara Strong in the third season of Skylanders Academy, and by Eden Riegel in Crash Bandicoot 4: It's About Time.

Coco's inclusion as a playable character in Crash Bandicoot: The Wrath of Cortex was met with a generally lukewarm response among critics. Hilary Goldstein of IGN felt that Coco was a "less powerful" and "less enjoyable" character than Crash and that "she was just not fun the way Crash is". On the subject, Goldstein added that "Crash is a silly creature to look at. He's almost absurd, which works great with his various animations. Coco isn't really silly at all. The game isn't called Crash and Coco so why must I be forced to play her? Rather than add variety, Coco detracts from the only real selling point of the game -- Crash Bandicoot." Mike Sabine at GameSpy was more indifferent to her inclusion in Wrath of Cortex, deeming it "mostly unnecessary," but also stated that it offered "a good chance of pace."

On the other hand, Coco's inclusion as a playable character in the N. Sane Trilogy and Crash 4 was met with positive reception. Patrick Arellano at Comic Book Resources included her in a list of "5 Game Remakes That Added A New Character For The Better." Cubed3 writer  Luke Hemming stated "...the ability to replay all levels as Coco Bandicoot, also add a welcome level of replayability in the linear first outing." Reviewing the N. Sane Trilogy, Aiman Maulana from New Straits Times observed that she has the same moveset as Crash, to which he stated "What's the purpose of this? Well, this game is catered to casual gamers so the developers want to cater to a general audience. Having Coco Bandicoot as a playable character will encourage more female gamers to play." At PlayStation Universe, Kevin R. considered the ability to play as Coco a "neat extra touch," but wished to see her with her own moveset. Denny Connolly at Game Rant stated "...swapping between characters should be a fun addition for fans of the original trilogy," due to the fact she has her own personality and animations in the game. Stacey Henley from The Guardian declared that Coco "adds a fresh dimension to the game," along with Cortex, Tawna and Dingodile in Crash 4.

Crunch Bandicoot
Crunch Bandicoot is a large and muscular genetically altered bandicoot with bionic enhancements that was created by Doctor Neo Cortex to destroy Crash Bandicoot. He first appears in Crash Bandicoot: The Wrath of Cortex as the final boss of each level, teaming up the with the Elementals. After his defeat, Crunch has a change of heart and joins Crash's family. He is voiced by Kevin Michael Richardson in Crash Bandicoot: The Wrath of Cortex and Crash Nitro Kart, Chris Williams in the Radical Entertainment games, and Ike Amadi in Crash Team Racing: Nitro Fueled.

Tawna
Tawna is the love interest of Crash who first appeared in Crash Bandicoot. By the time of Crash's creation, she is the only other creature to not have been subjected to the Cortex Vortex. After Crash is ejected from Cortex's castle, Tawna spends her captivity matching wits with Cortex, attempting to reason with Brio, and fomenting rebellion amongst Cortex's henchmen. After Crash defeats Cortex and rescues Tawna, they live idyllically together until Tawna leaves Crash for Pinstripe preceding the events of Crash Bandicoot 2: Cortex Strikes Back. She and Pinstripe later appear as playable characters in the party game Crash Boom Bang!. An alternate version of Tawna is a playable character in Crash Bandicoot 4: It's About Time. She is originally from a dimension known as the "Tawnaverse", where she is the protagonist of her home universe instead of Crash.

During production of Crash Bandicoot, Tawna was originally named Karmen, and was based on actress Pamela Anderson, but her design was scaled back to be less provocative. Naughty Dog omitted Tawna from further entries in the series based both on objections from Universal Interactive's marketing director for her perceived sexist nature, and to appease the desire of Sony's Japanese marketing team for a more girlish female supporting character. Tawna is voiced by Debi Derryberry in the N. Sane Trilogy, Misty Lee in Crash Team Racing Nitro-Fueled and by Ursula Taherian in Crash Bandicoot 4: It's About Time.

Antagonists

Doctor Neo Cortex

Doctor Neo Cortex is the main antagonist of the Crash Bandicoot series and the archenemy of the titular character, Crash Bandicoot. Cortex is a mad scientist who seeks to achieve world domination as an act of vengeance for the ridicule he has suffered in the past. To achieve this goal, Cortex mutated a collection of animals into his soldiers. He eventually created Crash Bandicoot, but rejected him as unworthy of being in his army and removed him from his castle. As Cortex's actions endanger the sanctity of the islands the games are set in, Cortex's plans for world domination are often hampered by Crash along with other characters. Crash's constant interference has made eliminating Crash one of Cortex's top priorities along with world domination.

Uka Uka
Uka Uka is the evil younger twin brother of Aku Aku and the supervisor of Cortex's plots for world domination. He was sealed in an underground prison by Aku Aku many years ago, but was freed in Crash Bandicoot: Warped when the ruins of Cortex's space station plummeted to Earth and destroyed his prison. He was voiced by Clancy Brown from 1998 to 2003, by Cornell John in Crash Bash, by Alex Fernandez in Crash Twinsanity, and by John DiMaggio from Crash of the Titans onward.

Dingodile
Dingodile is a former subordinate of Doctor Neo Cortex who is a mutated hybrid of a dingo and crocodile. He has often appeared as a boss or playable character in the series. In Crash Bandicoot 4: It's About Time, Dingodile has retired from Cortex's service in favor of operating a diner. Dingodile is voiced by William Hootkins in Crash Bandicoot: Warped, by David Anthony Pizzuto in Crash Team Racing, by Dwight Schultz in Crash Nitro Kart and Crash Twinsanity, by Nolan North in the Nintendo DS version of Crash of the Titans, and by Fred Tatasciore from Crash Bandicoot N. Sane Trilogy onwards.

Dingodile was conceptualized by Naughty Dog employee Joe Labbe, who requested a character that was a cross between a dingo and a crocodile. Charles Zembillas drew the first sketches of Dingodile on February 4, 1998. At certain points, the character alternatively wore an Australian-style hat, had a "mop of scruffy hair" and walked on all fours. Naughty Dog initially wanted Dingodile to be a fire-breathing character before Zembillas suggested giving him a flamethrower to make him "much more interesting". The final sketches of Dingodile were drawn on February 12, 1998. Zembillas has expressed happiness at Dingodile's enthusiastic following amongst fans.

Doctor Nefarious Tropy
Doctor Nefarious Tropy is a pompous scientist who specializes in time travel and fights using a giant tuning fork. Tropy is voiced by Michael Ensign in the Naughty Dog games, Crash Nitro Kart and Crash Twinsanity, Corey Burton in Crash Bandicoot: The Wrath of Cortex, Crash Bandicoot N. Sane Trilogy and Crash Team Racing Nitro-Fueled, and JP Karliak in Crash Bandicoot 4: It's About Time, with his female counterpart voiced by Sarah Tancer in It's About Time. Tropy was created by Naughty Dog as a time-traveling boss that would fit in a time-traveling plot. Charles Zembillas drew the first sketches of Tropy (and the doodle he created as Naughty Dog was describing the character to him) on January 22, 1998. Tropy's wearable time-traveling device was conceptualized early on in the character's design evolution and initially appeared as a belt-like contraption that featured a digital read out displaying the year Tropy intended to travel to. At one point in its aesthetic development, Tropy's time machine was covered in clock gears and mechanisms, including a cuckoo clock on the machine's lower-right area; Zembillas assumed that the details could be created as a texture in Adobe Photoshop and placed over the modeled character's polygon structure. Furthermore, the pistons on the back of the machine were connected to each other through joint-like bearings. These details were ultimately omitted for being too complex for the original PlayStation console to handle. The exhaust pipes and pistons were retained due to their reflection of Tropy's unhealthy obsession with time.

Nina Cortex
Nina Cortex is the gothic niece of Doctor Neo Cortex who sometimes aids him in his quest for world domination. She is voiced by Susan Silo in Crash Twinsanity, Amy Gross in the Radical Entertainment games, and Debi Derryberry in Crash Team Racing Nitro-Fueled and the DS version of Crash of the Titans. Nina Cortex was originally created and designed by Duke Mighten for Traveller's Tales as a playable character in Crash Nitro Kart before development duties of the game were transferred to Vicarious Visions. During her conception it was undecided whether she would be Neo Cortex's daughter or niece, hence the deliberate discrepancies regarding her relationship with Cortex in Crash Twinsanity. As everyone kept referring to her as Neo's niece, the label stuck and became official. Her appearance was based on one of the designers working at Traveller's Tales.

Originally debuting in  Crash Bandicoot Purple: Ripto's Rampage (also developed by Vicarious Visions), Nina's appearance in Crash Twinsanity was met with a positive response among critics. James B. Pringle of IGN said that Nina "almost steals the show with her sassy skip and her Bionic Commando-like extension arm" and admitted that he "actually wouldn't mind seeing more of Nina in the future." Nick Valentino of GameZone praised her as "an inventive character", a "very welcome addition to the series" and "one of the many highlights this game has to offer". He also compared her bionic arms to Bionic Commando.

Nitros Oxide
Nitros Oxide is the main antagonist of Crash Team Racing. He is an extraterrestrial from the planet Gasmoxia who claims to be the fastest driver in the galaxy, and challenges Crash and his friends to race him under the threat of the Earth being turned into a concrete parking lot and its inhabitants enslaved. He also appears as a boss character in Crash Bash and as a playable character in Crash Nitro Kart. He is voiced by David Anthony Pizzuto in Crash Team Racing, by Quinton Flynn in Crash Nitro Kart, and by Corey Burton from Crash Team Racing Nitro-Fueled onwards.

Evil Twins
The Evil Twins, Victor and Moritz, are the main antagonists of Crash Twinsanity. Originally Cortex's pet parrots, they were transported to the Tenth Dimension during Cortex's first experiment with the Evolvo-Ray and mutated by the environment's "reverso-radiation". Years later, they attempt to exact revenge on Cortex and destroy the Wumpa Islands, but are defeated by Crash, Cortex and Nina, and they are eaten by an evil version of Crash. Both twins are voiced by Quinton Flynn.

Supporting protagonists

Polar
Polar is a polar bear cub that Crash uses as a mount in certain levels of Crash Bandicoot 2: Cortex Strikes Back and the "Bears Repeating" level of Crash Bandicoot 4: It's About Time. He appears as a playable character in Crash Team Racing and Crash Nitro Kart. Polar is voiced by Debi Derryberry in Crash Nitro Kart and Misty Lee in Crash Team Racing Nitro-Fueled.

Pura
Pura is a South China tiger cub that Coco uses as a mount in the China-themed levels of Crash Bandicoot: Warped. He appears as a playable character in Crash Team Racing, Crash Nitro Kart and Crash Boom Bang!. Pura is voiced by Paul Greenberg in Crash Nitro Kart and by Misty Lee in Crash Team Racing Nitro-Fueled.

Baby T
Baby T is a young Tyrannosaurus that Crash uses as a mount in some prehistoric-themed levels of Crash Bandicoot: Warped. He appears as a playable character in Crash Team Racing Nitro-Fueled, in which he is voiced by Ike Amadi.

Quantum Masks
The Quantum Masks − consisting of Lani-Loli, Akano, Kupuna-Wa and Ika-Ika − are a group of extra-dimensional masks who appear in Crash Bandicoot 4: It's About Time and can give Crash and Coco a unique power. Lani-Loli is a worrisome, panic-prone mask who can phase objects in and out of existence. Akano is a stoic and terse mask who can grant Crash and Coco a powerful "Dark Matter Spin" that allows them to glide. Kupuna-Wa is an omniscient mask with an elderly woman's personality who can temporarily slow the flow of time. Ika-Ika is a two-faced mask with separate personalities − one a mild-mannered old man and the other a self-deprecating and negative young man − who can reverse gravity. Lani-Loli is voiced by Richard Steven Horvitz; Kupuna-Wa is voiced by Cherise Boothe; Akano is voiced by Fred Tatasciore and Ika-Ika's old and young halves are respectively voiced by Tatasciore and Zeno Robinson.

Supporting antagonists

Doctor N. Gin
Doctor N. Gin is the ill-tempered right-hand man of Doctor Neo Cortex, replacing Doctor Nitrus Brio after Crash Bandicoot. A former defense industry physicist, a nuclear missile lodged itself into his head during a failed experiment. N. Gin was able to retool the missile into a life support system, though the missile tends to go off during fits of anger. N. Gin often appears as a boss character, usually battling Crash and his friends with large mechas.

N. Gin is voiced by Brendan O'Brien in the Naughty Dog games, by Corey Burton in Crash Bandicoot: The Wrath of Cortex, Crash Bandicoot N. Sane Trilogy, Crash Team Racing Nitro-Fueled and Crash Bandicoot 4: It's About Time, by Quinton Flynn in Crash Nitro Kart and Crash Twinsanity, and by Nolan North in the Radical Entertainment games. Matthew Hahn, in his book The Animated Peter Lorre, identified N. Gin as one of several animated caricatures of actor Peter Lorre.

Tiny Tiger
Tiny Tiger is a hulking and brutish thylacine subordinate of Doctor Neo Cortex who often appears as a boss in the mainline games and as a playable character in spin-offs. He is voiced by Brendan O'Brien in Crash Bandicoot: Warped and Crash Team Racing, by John DiMaggio in Crash Nitro Kart, Crash Bandicoot N. Sane Trilogy and Crash Team Racing Nitro-Fueled, by Chris Williams in the Radical Entertainment games, and by Nolan North in the Nintendo DS version of Crash of the Titans.

Doctor Nitrus Brio
Doctor Nitrus Brio is a treacherous subordinate of Doctor Neo Cortex who created the Evolvo-Ray. He often appears as a boss character who uses chemical concoctions as a weapon and to increase his own power. Brio is voiced by Brendan O'Brien in Crash Bandicoot and Crash Bandicoot 2: Cortex Strikes Back; Maurice LaMarche in Crash: Mind over Mutant and Crash Bandicoot N. Sane Trilogy; Tom Kenny in Crash Team Racing Nitro-Fueled; and Roger Craig Smith in Crash Bandicoot 4: It's About Time. Brio was created by Naughty Dog as a foil for Doctor Cortex: "meek to Cortex's strength, logical to Cortex's emotional, successful (his inventions work) to Cortex's failure".

Ripper Roo
Ripper Roo is a crazed kangaroo who was one of Cortex's first experiments with the Evolvo-Ray and Cortex Vortex. Following his initial transformation, Cortex impatiently subjected the dazed and unresponsive Ripper Roo to the Cortex Vortex and switched it to overload for 24 hours, resulting in Ripper Roo's chaotic mental state. Ripper Roo is perpetually bound in a straitjacket and is armed with razor sharp toenails. He is in a constant state of agitated motion, is unpredictable in his behavior and is prone to fits of maniacal chortling. Ripper Roo appears as a boss character in Crash Bandicoot, Crash Bandicoot 2: Cortex Strikes Back and Crash Team Racing, and as an obstacle in the "El Pogo Loco" level of Crash Bash. Ripper Roo's laughter in the original PlayStation titles is a sample of a hyena (voiced by Dallas McKennon) from the 1955 film Lady and the Tramp. He is voiced by Jess Harnell in the Crash Bandicoot N. Sane Trilogy and by Andrew Morgado in Crash Team Racing Nitro-Fueled.

Papu Papu
Papu Papu is the obese and short-tempered chief of N. Sanity Island's native tribe of Lemurian descendants. Although formerly a great warrior, he has become lazy and content to let Cortex's activities go unnoticed by his tribe, attributing the increasing pollution and shortage of fish to divine retribution. He appears as a boss character in Crash Bandicoot, Crash Team Racing and Crash Bash. In Crash Twinsanity, he captures Cortex after he stumbles into his village, and orders Crash's capture after Crash rescues Cortex. Papu Papu is voiced by producer David Siller in Crash Bandicoot, by David Anthony Pizzuto in Crash Team Racing and by Dwight Schultz from Crash Twinsanity onwards.

Komodo Brothers
The Komodo Brothers, Joe and Moe, are a pair of mutated scimitar-wielding Komodo dragons who appear as boss characters in Crash Bandicoot 2: Cortex Strikes Back and Crash Bash; Joe appears alone as a boss character in Crash Team Racing. Joe is lean and smart while Moe is large and strong. Joe is voiced by David Anthony Pizzuto in Crash Team Racing. Moe is voiced by Brendan O'Brien in Crash Bandicoot 2: Cortex Strikes Back and Crash Bash. Both brothers are voiced by Fred Tatasciore in the Crash Bandicoot N. Sane Trilogy and Crash Team Racing Nitro-Fueled.

Pinstripe Potoroo
Pinstripe Potoroo is a potoroo clad in a red pinstripe suit and often armed with a tommy gun. He appears as a boss character in Crash Bandicoot and Crash Team Racing and as a playable character in Crash Boom Bang!. Pinstripe is voiced by Brendan O'Brien in Crash Bandicoot and Crash Team Racing, by Jess Harnell in the Crash Bandicoot N. Sane Trilogy, and by Robbie Daymond in Crash Team Racing Nitro-Fueled.

Koala Kong
Koala Kong is a mutant koala who was Cortex's second experiment with the Evolvo-Ray, which granted him super-strength. As Cortex was reluctant to subject Kong to the Cortex Vortex following his failure with Ripper Roo, he allowed Kong's brain to develop at its own pace. Kong then acquired a fixation with the Rocky film series and adopted Rocky Balboa's persona, adopting a New York accent, addressing everyone he speaks to as "Adrianna", and a determination that makes him a durable foe. Koala Kong appears as a boss character in Crash Bandicoot and as a playable character in Crash Bash and Crash Team Racing Nitro-Fueled. He is voiced by Fred Tatasciore in the Crash Bandicoot N. Sane Trilogy and Nitro-Fueled.

Elementals
The Elementals − consisting of Rok-Ko, Wa-Wa, Py-Ro and Lo-Lo − are a group of evil masks revived by Uka Uka in Crash Bandicoot: The Wrath of Cortex to act as a power source for Crunch Bandicoot. They are sealed away once more by Crash's efforts. Rok-Ko, Wa-Wa, Py-Ro and Lo-Lo are respectively voiced by Thomas F. Wilson, R. Lee Ermey, Mark Hamill and Jess Harnell. They reappeared in Crash Bandicoot: On the Run! as mini-bosses, working alongside Uka Uka.

References

Citations

Bibliography

Crash Bandicoot
 
Fictional anthropomorphic characters
Activision Blizzard
Anthropomorphic video game characters
Universal Pictures cartoons and characters